Estrella Blanca (real name unknown; January 15, 1938 – November 15, 2021) was a Mexican Luchador enmascarado, or masked professional wrestler. Estrella Blanca was most known for his claim to have won more Luchas de Apuestas "bet matches" than anyone, winning more masks and hair than any other Luchador. Blanca claimed to have been in 700 Luchas de Apuestas since making his wrestling debut in 1954. "Estrella Blanca" is Spanish for "White Star".

Professional wrestling career
Estrella Blanca made his professional wrestling debut in 1954, starting out as "Estrella Blanca", an enmascarado, or masked wrestler, who wore a blue mask with white edge trim around the eye, nose, and mouth opening and a white star on the forehead. Initially, Estrella Blanca only wore the mask during matches and not backstage like most Luchadors do, it was not until he met El Santo backstage at a wrestling event that he learned the importance of always wearing the mask when in public, Santo taught him that it was a part of the "wrestling illusion" and that it allowed Estrella Blanca privacy when he needed it. By the early 1960s Estrella Blanca had already won several Luchas de Apuestas matches, a Lucha Libre match where the competitors "bet" their mask or hair. On August 20, 1968, Estrella Blanca defeated Raul Guerrero to win the Mexican National Lightweight Championship. Over the next year Estrella Blanca defended the title on a couple of occasions, warding off the challenge of former champion Raul Guerrero. On September 20, 1969, Estrella Blanca lost the Mexican National Lightweight Championship to Rodolfo Ruiz. Blanca would make several unsuccessful bids for the Lightweight title over the next couple of years until he finally unseated Rodolfo Ruiz on August 11, 1971. Over the next year and a half Blanca only made a limited number of defenses, including one against "Taro" in 1972. On April 11, 1993 Taro ended Estrella Blanca's second and final run with the Lightweight title. In subsequent years Estrella Blanca focused more on winning Apuestas matches, winning numerous masks and hairs throughout the decade. At some point in either the late 1970s or early 1980s, Estrella Blanca began defending the AWA World Lightweight Championship, records are unclear on the lineage of the title although it is unlikely that it was sanctioned by the Minnesota-based American Wrestling Association. In later interviews, Blanca would claim that he successfully defended the title over 50 times.

By the early 1980s Estrella Blanca's Apuestas record had grown to over 200 confirmed wins and by the end of his career Blanca claimed to have won nearly 700 Apuestas matches, with just over 200 wins having been documented. The just over 200 Apuestas wins is the most wins for any luchador. Luchador Super Muñeco claims to hold the record for the most Apuestas wins, but with just over 100 confirmed wins he is a close second. Blanca has stated that his most memorable Luchas de Apuestas match was a 1977 match where he teamed with Ultraman to defeat the team of Zeus and Pantera Azul. In the late 1980s Estrella Blanca's career slowed down significantly, before finally retiring. In the final years of his career Estrella Blanca was offered half a million pesos (this was before the Pesos crashed in the mid-1990s) by World Wrestling Association promoter Benjamin Mora if he would lose his mask in a match, but Estrella Blanca turned him down, opting to retire without losing his mask. Since his retirement in the early 1990s Estrella Blanca has made a couple of "special appearances", mainly teaming with "Estrella Blanca, Jr.", who is his son as well as "Estrella Blanca II" or "Estrella Blanca III"; Neither of whom are actually related to Estrella Blanca but has his permission to use the name and mask. During CMLL's 75th Anniversary celebration in 2008 Estrella Blanca was invited to make an appearance during a show in Mexico City and was one of the legends honored during the show along with Leon Negro, Tony Lopez, Saeta Azteca, and Manuel Robles.

Personal life
Estrella Blanca was married to Teresa Flores Bocanegra, the daughter of his wrestling trainer "Sardo" Flores. The two were married in 1958 and together had a son who wrestles as "Estrella Blanca, Jr." Early on in their marriage, Blanca promised his wife to never be unmasked to ensure that the couple could move in public without attracting any unwarranted attention. Blanca stated that the promise to never unmask was stronger than any monetary reward ever offered by a promoter. He also stated that he wanted to be buried with his mask on.

Championships and accomplishments
AWA
AWA World Lightweight Championship (1 time)
Empresa Mexicana de Lucha Libre
Mexican National Lightweight Championship (2 times)
Mexican local promotions
Veracruz Welterweight Championship (1 time)

Luchas de Apuestas record

Footnotes

References

General - Luchas de Apuestas record

Specific

1938 births
2021 deaths
Mexican male professional wrestlers
Professional wrestlers from Michoacán
20th-century professional wrestlers